Weiyuan County is a county of Sichuan Province, China. It is under the administration of Neijiang City. The county borders Neijiang, Zigong, Rongxian, Zizhong and Renshou. It administers 20 townships.

Climate

References

County-level divisions of Sichuan